Gerald Burke (2 December 1930 – 24 June 1994) was an Australian rules footballer in the Victorian Football League.

Burke made his debut for the Carlton Football Club in the Round 6 of the 1953 season. He retired at the end of the 1960 season.

External links
 Gerald Burke at Blueseum
 
 

Carlton Football Club players
Australian rules footballers from Victoria (Australia)
1930 births
1994 deaths